The STG-556 is a Steyr AUG clone formerly manufactured by Microtech Small Arms Research (MSAR). It was available in civilian and military/law enforcement (select-fire) variants.

History
It was introduced at the 2007 SHOT Show. The first few STG-556 rifles were chambered in .223 Caliber.

MSAR closed down permanently on March 20, 2015. No specific reasons were stated on their website, but it is well known that Steyr setting up a US based manufacturing arm, producing genuine Steyr AUG firearms, all but eliminated the need for anyone to buy a clone.

When MSAR started, and for several years following, there was no way for a US Resident to buy a new Steyr AUG, only AUGs (and USRs) that had been imported prior to the final Clinton executive order which banned further importation of the neutered USR.

Design
The STG-556's design was based on the original Steyr AUG since the patents expired at the time. It features a bolt release as seen on the M16 rifle and a forward assist. Otherwise, the STG-556 retains the features similar to the Steyr AUG, such as having the quick-change barrel option and the ability to change which side the weapon ejects from by changing the bolt out for a right or left side bolt respectively. The STG-556 has a right-side ejector.

The STG-556 uses a short-stroke gas piston. The rifle can be converted from either having a telescopic sight or a MIL-STD-1913 rail. Various accessories can be attached on the rail.

The STG-556 uses magazines similar to those used by the Steyr AUG, although they can take 30-round STANAG and Magpul PMAG magazines. The XM-17E4 variant can use STANAG magazines.

The rifle formerly was available in black, tan or green finish.

Variants

STG-556 Limited Edition
A limited edition STG-556, a clone of the Steyr AUG A3, had a production run of only 1,000 rifles. There was a limited production of 232 rifles produced with an 18.5" heavy barrel after tests proved that length provided optimum accuracy over the 24" length due to barrel harmonics.

STG-556 Gebirgsjäger
The STG-556 Gebirgsjäger had a production run of 500 rifles. It was named after the Gebirgsjäger, which means Mountain Huntsmen.

STG-556 E4
The STG-556 E4 was introduced at the 2009 SHOT Show. It can use AR-15 and M16 magazines. For any E4s that use .300 AAC Blackout, they can use the 18.5" barrel.

Similar US weapons
The TPD USA AXR revealed at the 2007 SHOT Show, manufactured by Tactical Products Design Inc., is a similar weapon.

References

Bullpup rifles
5.56 mm assault rifles
.300 BLK firearms